RKHVV is a football club from Huissen, Netherlands. RKHVV plays in the 2017–18 Sunday Hoofdklasse A.

References

External links
 Official site

Football clubs in the Netherlands
Football clubs in Lingewaard
Association football clubs established in 1933
1933 establishments in the Netherlands